Lake Gem is a round lake on the north side of Winter Haven, Florida, United States. On its north side is residential housing. On its east, west and south, it is bordered by trees. It is just north of the Polk State College campus. 11th Street Northeast passes  to the east of Lake Gem.

Lake Gem has no public boat ramp or swimming beach. The only public access is along the strip of land bordering 11th Street. The Hook and Bullet website says Lake Gem contains largemouth bass, bluegill and crappie.

References

Gem